Omar Ruben Rada Silva (born 16 July 1943) is a Uruguayan percussionist, composer, and singer. He is closely associated with candombe, a genre built around a chorus of tamboriles, Uruguayan barrel drums. Rada has recorded more than thirty albums. His music, labelled candombe beat, combines pop, rock, and other styles with Uruguayan sounds, such as candombe drums and murga choruses. Rada has composed some of Uruguay's most cherished songs.

Career
In 1965, he and Eduardo Mateo formed the band .  This was the first group in Uruguay to create the beat genre in Spanish (Castilian) and to fuse rock with Latin American musical styles. In 1969 the success of his Candombe song "Las Manzanas" ("The Apples") led to his first solo album and participation in the Festival of Popular Music in Rio de Janeiro, Brazil.
A year later he formed the band Tótem.  He has recorded more than thirty albums.

In 1977, he traveled to the United States after an invitation by the Fattoruso Brothers to play with the group OPA. Over the next year, he performed with Tom Scott, Ray Barretto, Hermeto Pascoal, and Flora Purim.

Between 1991 and 1994, he settled in Mexico, where he worked as a composer and arranger for local musicians such as Mijares, Eugenia León, Stephanie Salas, and Tania Libertad.  In 1994 he shared the spotlight with Sting and UB40 at the Palacio de Deportes in Mexico City.

Rada has achieved renown outside the country and recorded under international labels, including EMI Latin and Universal Records. His songs are played worldwide and have been recorded by Milton Nascimento,  Herb Alpert, and Lani Hall.  He was invited by Jon Anderson and Joan Manuel Serrat to appear on their albums Deseo and Utopía, respectively.  British singer Paul McCartney and Brazilian singer Milton Nascimento are among his admirers.

His albums Montevideo (1996) and Montevideo II (1999) were recorded in New York City with Hiram Bullock, Anton Fig, José Pedro Beledo, Hugo Fattoruso, Bakithi Kumalo, and Ringo Thielmann. Montevideo reached platinum sales in Uruguay

He voiced the part of Lucius Best/Frozone in the 2004 Argentinian dubbing of The Incredibles. He has directed radio and TV shows, such as Radar (radio) and El Teléfono (TV). Beginning in October 2007, he starred in the television sitcom La Oveja Negra (The Black Sheep).

In April 2010, the third round of the series LifeLines at the Haus der Kulturen der Welt in Berlin paid tribute to Rubén Rada. Three days of concerts and discussions took place about his life and career as part of the Bicentenario, focusing on 200 years of independence movements in Latin America.

Also in 2010, Rada recorded a show in the Argentine program Encuentro en El Estudio, which is run by that country's Ministry of Education.

Discography
The albums Magic Time (Opa – Fantasy Records), Montevideo, and Montevideo II (Big World) were released in the U.S., Japan, France, Italy, Sweden, and Germany.

Released in Uruguay
 1968 Circa 1968 (Sondor)                                  
 1969 Las Manzanas (Sondor)                                  
 1970 Musicasión 4 ½ (Sondor)                                  
 1971 Totem (Sondor)                                  
 1972 Descarga (Sondor)                                  
 1972 Rada (Sondor)                                  
 1974 Camerata Punta del Este (Sondor)                                  
 1975 Radeces (Ayui)                                  
 1987 Botija de mi pais (Sondor)                                  
 1991 Fisico de Rock (Sondor)                                  
 1992 Concierto por la vida (Orfeo)                                  
 1993 Lo mejor de Rada Vol. I (Sondor)                                  
 1996 Botijas Band con Ruben Rada (Orfeo)                                  
 1996 Montevideo (Big World)                                  
 1997 Miscelanea Negra (Ayui)                                  
 1998 Black (Universal)                                  
 1999 Rada Para Ninos (Zapatito)                                  
 1999 Montevideo Dos (Big World)                                  
 2000 ¿Quien va a Cantar? (Universal)                                  
 2001 Suenos de Nino (Zapatito)                                  
 2003 Alegre Caballero (Zapatito)                                  
 2004 Rubenra (Zapatito)                                  
 2005 Candombe Jazz Tour (EMI)                                  
 2006 Richie Silver (EMI)                                  
 2007 Varsovia con Javier Malosetti (Zapatito/Oday)                                  
 2008 Bailongo (Sony)                                  
 2009 Fan (MMG)                                  
 2011 Confidence, Rada Instrumental (MMG)                                  
 2015 Tango, milonga y candombe (MMG)

Released in Argentina
 1974 S.O.S.
 1980 La Banda
 1981 La Rada
 1982 En Familia
 1983 La Cosa Se Pone Negra
 1984 Adar Nebur
 1986 La Yapla Mata
 1987 Siete Vidas
 1989 Pa' los Uruguayos (Melopea)
 1990 Las aventuras de R. Rada y Litto Nebbia(Melopea)
 1991 Las aventuras de R. Rada y H. Fattoruso (Melopea)
 1991 Terapia de Murga (Melopea)
 1997 Montevideo (Argendisc)
 1997 Miscelanea Negra (Aqua)
 1998 Black (Universal)
 2000 Quien Va a Cantar (Universal)
 2003 Alegre Caballero (EMI)
 2004 Rubenra (EMI)
 2005 Candombe Jazz Tour (EMI)
 2006 Richie Silver (EMI)
 2007 Varsovia(Ruben Rada/Javier Malosetti) (Sony)
 2008 Bailongo (Sony)
 2010 Fan (Sony)
 2011 Confidence, Rada Instrumental (Sony)
 2015 Tango, milonga y candombe (MMG)

Filmography
  (1986)
 El chevrolé (1999)
Porque te quiero así (2011)

Personal life
Rada, an Afro-Uruguayan, is of partial Brazilian descent through his mother.

See also
Uruguayan rock
Candombe
Tótem

References

External links

 
  Article on culturebase.net: "Uruguay’s Undiscovered Giant"
 The Latin Recording Academy press release 2011 Special Awards
 "Afro-Uruguayan innovator Ruben RADA Receives 2011 Lifetime Achievement Award from The Latin Recording Academy"

1943 births
Living people
Afro-Uruguayan
Musicians from Montevideo
Singers from Montevideo
Uruguayan musicians
20th-century Uruguayan male singers
Uruguayan songwriters
Male songwriters
Uruguayan jazz musicians
Uruguayan percussionists
21st-century Uruguayan male singers
Grammy Award winners
Latin Grammy Lifetime Achievement Award winners
Latin music songwriters
Uruguayan people of Brazilian descent

Male jazz musicians
Opa (Uruguayan band) members
Recipients of the Delmira Agustini Medal